Čatići  is a village in the municipality of Kakanj, Bosnia and Herzegovina.

Demographics 
According to the 2013 census, its population was 1,070.

Notable people from Čatići
 Bono Benić, franciscan, historian

References

Populated places in Kakanj